The 1985–86 Bundesliga was the 23rd season of the Bundesliga, the premier football league in West Germany. It began on 9 August 1985 and ended on 26 April 1986. Bayern Munich were the defending champions.

Competition modus
Every team played two games against each other team, one at home and one away. Teams received two points for a win and one point for a draw. If two or more teams were tied on points, places were determined by goal difference and, if still tied, by goals scored. The team with the most points were crowned champions while the two teams with the fewest points were relegated to 2. Bundesliga. The third-to-last team had to compete in a two-legged relegation/promotion play-off against the third-placed team from 2. Bundesliga.

Team changes to 1984–85
Karlsruher SC and Eintracht Braunschweig were directly relegated to the 2. Bundesliga after finishing in the last two places. They were replaced by 1. FC Nürnberg and Hannover 96. Karlsruhe and Braunschweig were eventually joined in demotion by relegation/promotion play-off participant Arminia Bielefeld, who lost on aggregate against 1. FC Saarbrücken.

Team overview

 Waldhof Mannheim played their matches in nearby Ludwigshafen because their own ground did not fulfil Bundesliga requirements.

League table

Results

Relegation play-offs
Borussia Dortmund and third-placed 2. Bundesliga team SC Fortuna Köln had to compete in a two-legged relegation/promotion play-off. After a two-leg series, both teams were tied 3–3 on aggregate, so a deciding third match had to be scheduled. Dortmund won this match, 8–0, and retained their Bundesliga status.

Top goalscorers
22 goals
  Stefan Kuntz (VfL Bochum)

21 goals
  Karl Allgöwer (VfB Stuttgart)

20 goals
  Frank Neubarth (SV Werder Bremen)

17 goals
  Cha Bum-Kun (Bayer 04 Leverkusen)

16 goals
  Thomas Allofs (1. FC Kaiserslautern)
  Jürgen Klinsmann (VfB Stuttgart)
  Klaus Täuber (FC Schalke 04)

15 goals
  Dieter Hoeneß (FC Bayern Munich)

14 goals
  Herbert Waas (Bayer 04 Leverkusen)
  Jürgen Wegmann (Borussia Dortmund)

Champion squad

See also
 1985–86 2. Bundesliga
 1985–86 DFB-Pokal

References

External links
 DFB Bundesliga archive 1985/1986

Bundesliga seasons
1
Germany